Miloš Mijalković (born 8 March 1978 in Belgrade) is a Serbian judoka. He participated at the 2004 Summer Olympics.

Achievements

References

External links
 
 

1978 births
Living people
Serbian male judoka
Judoka at the 2004 Summer Olympics
Olympic judoka of Serbia and Montenegro
Sportspeople from Belgrade
Mediterranean Games silver medalists for Yugoslavia
Competitors at the 2001 Mediterranean Games
Competitors at the 2005 Mediterranean Games
Competitors at the 2009 Mediterranean Games
Mediterranean Games gold medalists for Serbia
Universiade medalists in judo
Mediterranean Games medalists in judo
Universiade bronze medalists for Serbia and Montenegro
21st-century Serbian people